The Pakistan cricket team toured England between April and June 2018 to play two Test matches. Ahead of the Tests, Pakistan played first-class matches against Kent and Northamptonshire. They then travelled to Dublin to play Ireland in their first Test match, before playing a two-day match against Leicestershire ahead of the first Test against England. At the end of the tour they played two Twenty20 Internationals (T20Is) against Scotland in Edinburgh. The Test series was drawn 1–1.

Squads

In April 2018, Pakistani leg-spin bowler Yasir Shah was ruled out for ten weeks, due to stress fracture of a hip, causing him to miss the entire tour. The report said that Yasir would need to "undergo extensive rehabilitation". The Pakistan selectors were reportedly considering either leg spinner Shadab Khan (who was chosen) or left-arm spinner Kashif Bhatti as replacement.

Babar Azam of Pakistan was ruled out of the remainder of the Test series after fracturing his forearm when he was hit by a delivery from Ben Stokes on the second day of the first Test. For the second Test, Keaton Jennings was added to England's squad, with Mark Stoneman being dropped. Sam Curran was also added to England's squad for the second Test, as cover for Ben Stokes, who suffered a hamstring injury.

Tour matches

First-class: Kent vs Pakistan

First-class: Northamptonshire vs Pakistan

Two-day match: Leicestershire vs Pakistan

Test series

1st Test

2nd Test

Notes

References

External links
 Series home at ESPN Cricinfo

2018 in English cricket
2018 in Pakistani cricket
International cricket competitions in 2018
Pakistani cricket tours of England